Caroline of Stolberg-Gedern (27 June 1732, in Gedern – 28 May 1796, in Langenburg) was a Princess of Stolberg-Gerdern by birth and by marriage a princess of Hohenlohe-Langenburg.

Early life
She was a daughter of Frederick Charles of Stolberg-Gedern and his wife, Countess Louise Henriette of Nassau-Saarbrücken (1705-1766).

Marriage and issue
On 13 April 1761 she married her first cousin Christian Albert, Prince of Hohenlohe-Langenburg (her mother was an elder sister of his mother). They had the following children:
 Charles Louis (10 September 1762 – 4 April 1825), married Countess Amalie of Solms-Baruth
 Louise Eleanore (11 August 1763 – 30 April 1837), married Duke George I of Saxe-Meiningen
 Gustav Adolph (9 October 1764 – 21 July 1796)
 Christine Caroline (19 November 1765 – 6 December 1768)
 Louis William (16 February 1767 – 17 December 1768)
 Christian August (15 March 1768 – 18 April 1796)
 Caroline Auguste (15 November 1769 – 30 July 1803)

House of Stolberg
1732 births
1796 deaths
18th-century German people
Princesses of Hohenlohe-Langenburg
German princesses